The 1999–2000 Duke Blue Devils men's basketball team represented Duke University. The head coach was Mike Krzyzewski. The team played its home games in Cameron Indoor Stadium in Durham, North Carolina, and was a member of the Atlantic Coast Conference.

Schedule and results

|-
!colspan=9 style=|Regular season

|-
!colspan=9 style=|ACC tournament

|-
!colspan=9 style=|NCAA tournament

Awards and honors
 Mike Krzyzewski, ACC Coach of the Year 
 Mike Krzyzewski, Legends of Coaching Award (adopted by the John R.Wooden Award Committee)
 Chris Carrawell, ACC Player of the Year

Team players drafted into the NBA

References

External links
Statistical Database- Duke Blue Devils Basketball Statistical Database

Duke
Duke Blue Devils men's basketball seasons
Duke
Duke
Duke